Lyces annulata is a moth of the  family Notodontidae. It is found from Venezuela to Peru along the eastern slopes of the Andes.

Larvae have been reared on Passiflora nitida, Passiflora cyanea and Passiflora maliformis.

External links
Species page at Tree of Life project

Notodontidae of South America
Moths described in 1909